Akkemer (also known as Aqkemer (Aqkemer, اقكەمەر)) is a town in Aktobe Region, west Kazakhstan.

References

Aktobe Region
Cities and towns in Kazakhstan